Zona Jones (born 1963 in Corpus Christi, Texas; raised in Valentine, Texas) is an American country music singer and attorney. Signed to D/Quarterback Records in 2004, he released his debut album Harleys & Horses and charted three singles from it, including the No. 47 "Two Hearts." In 2008, he signed to Rocky Comfort Records, a label owned by Tracy Lawrence, to release his next album, 2009's Prove Me Right.

Discography

Albums

Singles

Music videos

References

External links
Zona Jones website

1961 births
American country singer-songwriters
American male singer-songwriters
Living people
People from Kingsville, Texas
People from Jeff Davis County, Texas
21st-century American singers
Country musicians from Texas
Singer-songwriters from Texas
People from Corpus Christi, Texas
21st-century American male singers